The 1983 Stanford Cardinal baseball team represented Stanford University in the 1983 NCAA Division I baseball season. The Cardinal played their home games at Sunken Diamond. The team was coached by Mark Marquess in his 7th year at Stanford.

The Cardinal won the Pacific-10 Conference South Division and the West I Regional to advanced to the College World Series, where they were defeated by the Michigan Wolverines.

Roster

Schedule 

! style="" | Regular Season
|- valign="top" 

|- align="center" bgcolor="#ccffcc"
| 1 || January 30 ||  || Sunken Diamond • Stanford, California || 17–10 || 1–0 || –
|- align="center" bgcolor="#ccffcc"
| 2 || January 31 || San Francisco || Sunken Diamond • Stanford, California || 28–5 || 2–0 || –
|-

|- align="center" bgcolor="#fffdd0"
| 3 || February 1 || at  || Unknown • Hayward, California || 8–8 || 2–0–1 || –
|- align="center" bgcolor="#ccffcc"
| 4 || February 2 || San Francisco || Sunken Diamond • Stanford, California || 6–3 || 3–0–1 || –
|- align="center" bgcolor="#ffcccc"
| 5 || February 4 || at  || Titan Field • Fullerton, California || 5–9 || 3–1–1 || –
|- align="center" bgcolor="#ffcccc"
| 6 || February 6 || at Cal State Fullerton || Titan Field • Fullerton, California || 2–3 || 3–2–1 || –
|- align="center" bgcolor="#ffcccc"
| 7 || February 6 || at Cal State Fullerton || Titan Field • Fullerton, California || 5–8 || 3–3–1 || –
|- align="center" bgcolor="#ffcccc"
| 8 || February 11 || at  || San Jose Municipal Stadium • San Jose, California || 2–3 || 3–4–1 || –
|- align="center" bgcolor="#ccffcc"
| 9 || February 14 || San Jose State || Sunken Diamond • Stanford, California || 9–2 || 4–4–1 || –
|- align="center" bgcolor="#ccffcc"
| 10 || February 14 || San Jose State || Sunken Diamond • Stanford, California || 15–11 || 5–4–1 || –
|- align="center" bgcolor="#ccffcc"
| 11 || February 15 ||  || Sunken Diamond • Stanford, California || 4–1 || 6–4–1 || –
|- align="center" bgcolor="#ccffcc"
| 12 || February 19 ||  || Sunken Diamond • Stanford, California || 8–3 || 7–4–1 || –
|- align="center" bgcolor="#ccffcc"
| 13 || February 19 || Pacific || Sunken Diamond • Stanford, California || 7–6 || 8–4–1 || –
|- align="center" bgcolor="#ccffcc"
| 14 || February 20 || at Pacific || Billy Hebert Field • Stockton, California || 13–1 || 9–4–1 || –
|- align="center" bgcolor="#ccffcc"
| 15 || February 21 ||  || Sunken Diamond • Stanford, California || 4–0 || 10–4–1 || –
|- align="center" bgcolor="#ccffcc"
| 16 || February 22 ||  || Sunken Diamond • Stanford, California || 9–8 || 11–4–1 || –
|- align="center" bgcolor="#ccffcc"
| 17 || February 25 || at  || Jackie Robinson Stadium • Los Angeles, California || 13–5 || 12–4–1 || 1–0
|- align="center" bgcolor="#ccffcc"
| 18 || February 29 || at UCLA || Jackie Robinson Stadium • Los Angeles, California || 7–1 || 13–4–1 || 1–0
|-

|- align="center" bgcolor="#ffcccc"
| 19 || March 4 || at  || Jerry Kindall Field at Frank Sancet Stadium • Tucson, Arizona || 3–4 || 13–5–1 || 1–1
|- align="center" bgcolor="#ccffcc"
| 20 || March 5 || at Arizona || Jerry Kindall Field at Frank Sancet Stadium • Tucson, Arizona || 10–9 || 14–5–1 || 2–1
|- align="center" bgcolor="#ccffcc"
| 21 || March 6 || at Arizona || Jerry Kindall Field at Frank Sancet Stadium • Tucson, Arizona || 15–6 || 15–5–1 || 3–1
|- align="center" bgcolor="#ccffcc"
| 22 || March 8 || at  || Unknown • Davis, California || 16–6 || 16–5–1 || 3–1
|- align="center" bgcolor="#ccffcc"
| 23 || March 19 ||  || Sunken Diamond • Stanford, California || 8–4 || 17–5–1 || 4–1
|- align="center" bgcolor="#ccffcc"
| 24 || March 25 || Arizona State || Sunken Diamond • Stanford, California || 9–8 || 18–5–1 || 5–1
|- align="center" bgcolor="#ccffcc"
| 25 || March 26 || Arizona State || Sunken Diamond • Stanford, California || 6–5 || 19–5–1 || 6–1
|- align="center" bgcolor="#ccffcc"
| 26 || March 26 || Arizona State || Sunken Diamond • Stanford, California || 6–5 || 20–5–1 || 7–1
|- align="center" bgcolor="#ccffcc"
| 27 || March 28 || Arizona State || Sunken Diamond • Stanford, California || 23–2 || 21–5–1 || 8–1
|- align="center" bgcolor="#ccffcc"
| 28 || March 29 ||  || Sunken Diamond • Stanford, California || 7–1 || 22–5–1 || 8–1
|- align="center" bgcolor="#ccffcc"
| 29 || March 30 || Santa Clara || Sunken Diamond • Stanford, California || 11–6 || 23–5–1 || 8–1
|-

|- align="center" bgcolor="#ccffcc"
| 30 || April 1 || at San Jose State || San Jose Municipal Stadium • San Jose, California || 9–2 || 24–5–1 || 8–1
|- align="center" bgcolor="#ccffcc"
| 31 || April 2 ||  || Sunken Diamond • Stanford, California || 7–2 || 25–5–1 || 8–1
|- align="center" bgcolor="#ffcccc"
| 32 || April 4 || at Santa Clara || Buck Shaw Stadium • Santa Clara, California || 4–7 || 25–6–1 || 8–1
|- align="center" bgcolor="#ccffcc"
| 33 || April 5 ||  || Sunken Diamond • Stanford, California || 14–3 || 26–6–1 || 8–1
|- align="center" bgcolor="#ffcccc"
| 34 || April 8 || at  || Evans Diamond • Berkeley, California || 4–7 || 26–7–1 || 8–2
|- align="center" bgcolor="#ccffcc"
| 35 || April 9 || California || Sunken Diamond • Stanford, California || 5–4 || 27–7–1 || 9–2
|- align="center" bgcolor="#ffcccc"
| 36 || April 10 || at California || Evans Diamond • Berkeley, California || 2–3 || 27–8–1 || 9–3
|- align="center" bgcolor="#ccffcc"
| 37 || April 15 ||  || Sunken Diamond • Stanford, California || 13–8 || 28–8–1 || 10–3
|- align="center" bgcolor="#ffcccc"
| 38 || April 15 || UCLA || Sunken Diamond • Stanford, California || 11–12 || 28–9–1 || 10–4
|- align="center" bgcolor="#ccffcc"
| 39 || April 16 || UCLA || Sunken Diamond • Stanford, California || 10–4 || 29–9–1 || 11–4
|- align="center" bgcolor="#ccffcc"
| 40 || April 17 || UCLA || Sunken Diamond • Stanford, California || 10–3 || 30–9–1 || 12–4
|- align="center" bgcolor="#ccffcc"
| 41 || April 18 || UCLA || Sunken Diamond • Stanford, California || 4–3 || 31–9–1 || 13–4
|- align="center" bgcolor="#ffcccc"
| 42 || April 22 || at Arizona State || Packard Stadium • Tempe, Arizona || 0–2 || 31–10–1 || 13–5
|- align="center" bgcolor="#ffcccc"
| 43 || April 23 || at Arizona State || Packard Stadium • Tempe, Arizona || 1–10 || 31–11–1 || 13–6
|- align="center" bgcolor="#ccffcc"
| 44 || April 24 || at Arizona State || Packard Stadium • Tempe, Arizona || 9–7 || 32–11–1 || 14–6
|-

|- align="center" bgcolor="#ffcccc"
| 45 || May 1 ||  || Sunken Diamond • Stanford, California || 2–4 || 32–12–1 || 14–7
|- align="center" bgcolor="#ffcccc"
| 46 || May 1 || Southern California || Sunken Diamond • Stanford, California || 1–3 || 32–13–1 || 14–8
|- align="center" bgcolor="#ccffcc"
| 47 || May 2 || Arizona || Sunken Diamond • Stanford, California || 5–3 || 33–13–1 || 15–8
|- align="center" bgcolor="#ccffcc"
| 48 || May 6 || at Southern California || Dedeaux Field • Los Angeles, California || 12–5 || 34–13–1 || 16–8
|- align="center" bgcolor="#ffcccc"
| 49 || May 7 || at Southern California || Dedeaux Field • Los Angeles, California || 2–13 || 34–14–1 || 16–9
|- align="center" bgcolor="#ffcccc"
| 50 || May 7 || at Southern California || Dedeaux Field • Los Angeles, California || 6–8 || 34–15–1 || 16–10
|- align="center" bgcolor="#ccffcc"
| 51 || May 8 || at Southern California || Dedeaux Field • Los Angeles, California || 12–5 || 35–15–1 || 17–10
|- align="center" bgcolor="#ccffcc"
| 52 || May 13 || California || Sunken Diamond • Stanford, California || 9–2 || 36–15–1 || 18–10
|- align="center" bgcolor="#ccffcc"
| 53 || May 14 || at California || Evans Diamond • Berkeley, California || 9–1 || 37–15–1 || 19–10
|- align="center" bgcolor="#ccffcc"
| 54 || May 15 || California || Sunken Diamond • Stanford, California || 6–3 || 38–15–1 || 20–10
|-

|-
|-
! style="" | Postseason
|- valign="top"

|- align="center" bgcolor="#ccffcc"
| 55 || May 27 ||  || Sunken Diamond • Stanford, California || 14–0 || 39–15–1 || 20–10
|- align="center" bgcolor="#ccffcc"
| 56 || May 28 ||  || Sunken Diamond • Stanford, California || 4–3 || 40–15–1 || 20–10
|- align="center" bgcolor="#ccffcc"
| 57 || May 29 ||  || Sunken Diamond • Stanford, California || 11–5 || 41–15–1 || 20–10
|-

|- align="center" bgcolor="#ffcccc"
| 58 || June 3 || vs Oklahoma State || Johnny Rosenblatt Stadium • Omaha, Nebraska || 1–3 || 41–16–1 || 20–10
|- align="center" bgcolor="#ccffcc"
| 59 || June 5 || vs  || Johnny Rosenblatt Stadium • Omaha, Nebraska || 3–1 || 42–16–1 || 20–10
|- align="center" bgcolor="#ffcccc"
| 60 || June 8 || vs Michigan || Johnny Rosenblatt Stadium • Omaha, Nebraska || 4–11 || 42–17–1 || 20–10
|-

Awards and honors 
Mike Aldrete
 First Team All-Pac-10

Jeff Ballard
 First Team All-Pac-10

Eric Hardgrave
 Pac-10 Conference South Division Player of the Year
 First Team All-Pac-10
 First Team All-American American Baseball Coaches Association

Vince Sakowski
 First Team All-Pac-10

References 

Stanford Cardinal baseball seasons
Stanford Cardinal baseball
College World Series seasons
Stanford
Pac-12 Conference baseball champion seasons